Ahmed Hayat (born 1 October 1977) is a Pakistani first-class cricketer who played for Faisalabad cricket team.

References

External links
 

1977 births
Living people
Pakistani cricketers
Faisalabad cricketers
Sargodha cricketers
Sui Northern Gas Pipelines Limited cricketers
Pakistan National Shipping Corporation cricketers
Cricketers from Sargodha